The 95th Assembly District of Wisconsin is one of 99 districts in the Wisconsin State Assembly.  Located in western Wisconsin, the district comprises all of the city of La Crosse in western La Crosse County.  It contains the University of Wisconsin–La Crosse campus, Western Technical College, and Viterbo University.  The district is represented by Democrat Jill Billings, since November 2011.

The 95th Assembly district is located within Wisconsin's 32nd Senate district, along with the 94th and 96th Assembly districts.

List of past representatives

References 

Wisconsin State Assembly districts
La Crosse County, Wisconsin